Dean Carroll Jones (January 25, 1931 – September 1, 2015) was an American actor. He was best known for his roles as Agent Zeke Kelso in That Darn Cat! (1965), Jim Douglas in The Love Bug (1968) and Herbie Goes to Monte Carlo (1977), and Dr. Herman Varnick in Beethoven (1992). He was nominated for a Golden Globe Award for his performance as Albert Dooley in The Million Dollar Duck (1971). In 1995, he was inducted as a Disney Legends award winner for his film work.

Early life
Jones was born on January 25, 1931, in Decatur, Alabama, to Andrew Guy Jones, a traveling construction worker, and the former Nolia Elizabeth Wilhite.

As a student at  Riverside High School in Decatur, Jones had his own local radio show, Dean Jones Sings. He served in the United States Navy during the Korean War, and after his discharge worked at the Bird Cage Theater at Knott's Berry Farm in Buena Park, California.

Jones attended Asbury University in Wilmore near Lexington, Kentucky. A member of its Class of 1953, he did not graduate, but the university in 2003 awarded him an honorary degree. On March 4, 2011, he addressed the community during the dedication ceremony of Asbury's Andrew S. Miller Center for Communications Arts.

Stage

After appearing in minor film and television roles, Jones made his Broadway debut in the 1960 play There Was a Little Girl. He stepped into the role in Boston, with only one day's notice. In 1960, he also played Dave Manning in the Broadway comedy Under the Yum-Yum Tree, a role he repeated in the 1963 movie version starring Jack Lemmon.

After working in film and television, Jones was set to return to Broadway as the star of Stephen Sondheim's musical Company in 1970. Shortly after opening night, he withdrew from the show, due to stress that he was undergoing from ongoing divorce proceedings. Director Harold Prince agreed to replace him with Larry Kert if Jones would open the show and record the cast album. He agreed, and his performance is preserved on the original cast album, although it was Kert who received the Tony nomination for Best Actor in a Musical.

In 1986, Jones, by then having become a fervent born-again Christian, starred in Into the Light, a musical about scientists and the Shroud of Turin, which closed after only six performances.  He had far more success touring in the one-man show St. John in Exile as the last surviving Apostle of Jesus Christ, reminiscing about his life while imprisoned on the Greek island of Patmos. One performance was filmed in 1986. He made one more Broadway appearance, in 1993, at the Vivian Beaumont Theater, in a special two-day concert staging of Company featuring most of the original Broadway cast.

Television and film

Jones began as a contract performer for MGM, beginning with a small role as a soldier in Somebody Up There Likes Me (1956) and he later played disc jockey Teddy Talbot in the Elvis Presley film Jailhouse Rock (1957).  He portrayed a soldier in both Imitation General (also 1957) with Glenn Ford and Never So Few (1959) with Frank Sinatra.
 
Jones subsequently starred in the NBC television sitcom Ensign O'Toole (1962–63), produced by Four Star Television, portraying an easy-going and inexperienced officer on a U.S. Navy destroyer. His costars included Jack Mullaney, Jack Albertson, Jay C. Flippen, Harvey Lembeck, and Beau Bridges. He also recorded a singing album, Introducing Dean Jones, for Valiant Records.

As Ensign O'Toole was the lead-in show on NBC to Walt Disney's The Wonderful World of Color, Disney ordered a print of Jones' latest film Under the Yum Yum Tree to study. Disney signed Jones for Disney film productions beginning with That Darn Cat!. His performance was well-received. Jones continued with Disney for many years, starring in films such as The Ugly Dachshund (1966), Monkeys, Go Home! (1966), Blackbeard's Ghost (1968), The Horse in the Gray Flannel Suit (1968). The Love Bug (1969), The Million Dollar Duck (1971), Snowball Express (1972), The Shaggy D.A. (1976), and Herbie Goes to Monte Carlo (1977).

Jones' signature Disney role would be as race car driver Jim Douglas in the successful Herbie series. In addition to the two feature films, Jones starred in the short-lived television series Herbie, the Love Bug (1982) and the made-for-TV movie The Love Bug (1997). In 1969, he was the host of a short-lived sketch-comedy hour on ABC-TV titled What's It All About, World? that became a variety show midway into its run, when the title was changed to The Dean Jones Variety Hour.

Away from Disney, Jones costarred with Broadway-era co-star Jane Fonda in the  romantic comedy, Any Wednesday (1966). In a dramatic turn, in the NBC television movie When Every Day Was the Fourth of July (1978) he portrayed Ed Cooper, an attorney in the 1930s who agrees to defend a man who has been accused of murder, accepting the case only after urging from his daughter. He reprised the role of Ed Cooper in the ABC television sequel The Long Days of Summer (1980). He appeared with Gregory Peck and Danny DeVito as Bill Coles, the president of Peck's company, which was fighting a hostile takeover by DeVito, in Other People's Money (1991).

Jones, who was known for playing pleasant characters, took on the role as Dr. Herman Varnick, the evil veterinarian in the family film Beethoven (1992). He employed method acting for the first time in his career and did not break character off-set throughout the film's shooting period much to the surprise of cast members as well as family and friends who had never seen him so immersed in a role. He maintained his relationship to the Beethoven franchise by providing the voice of George Newton in the animated television version of Beethoven. He also appeared in a small role as Director of Central Intelligence Judge Arthur Moore in the film adaptation of Tom Clancy's Clear and Present Danger (1994), which stars Harrison Ford.

Jones also appeared in two episodes of the Angela Lansbury series Murder, She Wrote in 1984 and 1988.

Personal life
Jones became a born-again Christian in 1973 or 1974. His book Under Running Laughter (1982) recounts his experience of Christianity. He had previously suffered from bouts of depression. His wife, Lory, said, "One night he got down on his knees and prayed that God would free him from the miserable moods that he had always suffered. He told me that in an instant it was gone and he felt peace and joy flood into his heart."

Jones appeared in several Christian films. In 1977 he portrayed Charles Colson in the feature film Born Again. He voiced the narrator in Birdwing Records' 1979 studio album Nathaniel the Grublet. Jones also voiced the standard English narration for the 80-minute Bible overview God's Story: From Creation to Eternity, and was the voice of Father Tim for Focus on the Family Radio Theatre audio drama At Home in Mitford in 2003.

On July 25, 1994, Jones was a guest on 100 Huntley Street, a Canadian Christian discussion program.

In 1998, Jones founded the Christian Rescue Committee (CRC), an organization that helps provide a "way of escape to Jews, Christians, and others persecuted for their faith".

Death
Jones died of Parkinson's disease in Los Angeles on September 1, 2015 at age 84. His body was cremated.

Filmography

Film

Television

Stage productions

References

External links
 
 
 

1931 births
2015 deaths
20th-century American male actors
20th-century Christians
21st-century American male actors
21st-century Christians
American Christians
American male film actors
American male radio actors
American male stage actors
American male television actors
American male voice actors
United States Navy personnel of the Korean War
Asbury University alumni
Neurological disease deaths in California
Deaths from Parkinson's disease
Disney people
Liberty Records artists
Male actors from Alabama
People from Decatur, Alabama
People from Greater Los Angeles
United States Navy sailors